Clark-Pleasant Community School Corporation (CPCSC) is a school district headquartered in Whiteland, Indiana. It serves Whiteland, New Whiteland, portions of Greenwood, and a very small section of Franklin.

Schools
Secondary schools:
Whiteland Community High School (Whiteland)
 Clark-Pleasant Middle School (Greenwood)
Elementary schools:
 Break-O-Day Elementary School (New Whiteland)
 Clark Elementary School (unincorporated area, Franklin address)
 Grassy Creek Elementary School (Greenwood)
 Pleasant Crossing Elementary School (Greenwood, Whiteland address)
 Whiteland Elementary School (Whiteland)

References

External links
 Clark-Pleasant Community School Corporation

School districts in Indiana
Education in Johnson County, Indiana